Abacetus assiniensis is a species of ground beetle in the subfamily Pterostichinae. It was described by Tschitscherine in 1899 and is found in Ivory Coast and Sudan.

References

assiniensis
Beetles described in 1899
Insects of West Africa
Insects of East Africa